Melampus bidentatus common name the "common marsh snail", or "eastern melampus", is a species of small, amphibious air-breathing snail, a pulmonate gastropod mollusk in the family Ellobiidae.

Description 
The maximum recorded shell length is 20 mm.

Habitat and distribution 
The minimum recorded depth for his species is 0 m; maximum recorded depth is 0 m. Like many others in the same family, this species of snail inhabits the high marsh zone of salt marshes, but it is also very common in the mud near oyster reefs. The native range of the snail is from the coast of Nova Scotia, Canada, to the Texas coast of the Gulf of Mexico. However, it is likely that this distribution involves at least three cryptic species with distinct physiological optima.

Adults of Melampus bidentatus can survive in a terrestrial environment, but its larvae require an aquatic habitat in order to survive.

The diet of this species consists of the decayed shoots of smooth cordgrass, Spartina alterniflora.

References

Ellobiidae
Gastropods described in 1822